Beating Heart (also known as Six Love Stories) is a South Korean television drama series, produced by MBC and broadcast in 2005. The series consists of six two-part stories, with each story having its own team of writer and director. It focuses on the lives of a typical Korean family, examining the relationships between the four main characters, their romantic interests, and other family members, while answering the question "When did you feel your heart beating the hardest?"

In 2006, the series was broadcast by the KBFD network in Hawaii as My Trembling Heart. It has also been released on DVD in South Korea and Japan.

Cast

Main characters 
Bae Doona as Bae Doona
Bae Jong-ok as Bae Jong-ok
Kim Chang-wan as Kim Chang-wan
Go Ah-sung as Kim Bo-mi

Supporting characters
Kim Dong-wan as Kang Sung-jae (episodes 1-2)
Shin Sung-woo as Jung Nam-soo (episodes 1-4)
Harisu as Kim Chang-ho/Kim Hae-jung (episodes 3–4, 9 & 12)
Kim Hak-joon as Chan (episodes 5-6)
Yoo Hye-jung as Chan's mother (episodes 5-6)
Choi Kang-hee as Oh Soo-kyung (episodes 7-8)
Choi Jung-won as Jung-hyun (episodes 7-8)
Ji Sung as Kim Woo-jin/Seok-jin (episodes 9-10)
Kim Soo-mi as Mae-shim (episodes 11-12)
Baek Il-seob as Mae-shim's partner (episodes 11-12)
Choi Soo-han

Staff

Directors 
Oh Kyung-hoon (episodes 1-2)
Ko Dong-seon (episodes 3-4)
Shin Hyung-chang (episodes 5-6)
Lee Yoon-jung (episodes 7-8)
Kim Jin-man (episodes 9-10)
Park Sung-soo (episodes 11-12)

Writers
Kim In-young (episodes 1-2)
Jung Hyung-soo (episodes 3-4)
Park Jung-hwan (episodes 5-6)
Hong Jin-ah (episodes 7-8)
Lee Kyung-hee (episodes 9-10)
In Jung-ok (episodes 11-12)

Airdates

References

External links
Beating Heart official MBC website 
Six Love Stories at MBC Global Media

2005 South Korean television series debuts
2005 South Korean television series endings
MBC TV television dramas
Korean-language television shows
South Korean romance television series
Television shows written by Lee Kyung-hee